Alvarez' syndrome is a medical disorder in which the abdomen becomes bloated without any obvious reason, such as intestinal gas. It may be caused when the muscles of the superior abdominal wall contract and push the contents of the abdomen inferiorly and anteriorly. It may be a psychogenic disorder. It was discovered by and named for Walter C. Alvarez in the late 1940s.

References 

Digestive diseases
Syndromes